Cheese spread is a soft spreadable cheese or processed cheese product. Various additional ingredients are sometimes used, such as multiple cheeses, fruits, vegetables and meats, and many types of cheese spreads exist. Pasteurized process cheese spread is a type of cheese spread prepared using pasteurized processed cheese and other ingredients.

Overview

Cheese spread is prepared using one or more cheeses or processed cheese and sometimes additional ingredients such as vegetables, fruits, meats and various spices and seasonings. Cheese spread is typically spread onto foods such as bread, toast, crackers and vegetables.

Cheese spread can be packaged in many ways: 
in plastic tubs
in small foil-wrapped triangles or squares grouped together in a cardboard container, such as Dairylea or The Laughing Cow
in a pressurized can in which the cheese product comes out in a string-like form, such as Easy Cheese
in a jar in semi-liquid form, such as Cheez Whiz
as a solid in a butter-like bar, such as Velveeta.

Varieties

Many types of cheese spreads exist, such as almogrote, Liptauer, cervelle de canut and tirokafteri, among others.

United States
In the United States, beer cheese spread is a traditional food of the U.S. state of Kentucky. Pimento cheese is a food in the cuisine of the Southern United States that has been referred to as the "pâté of the south" and "Carolina caviar". Port wine cheese is mass-produced in the United States under several brands. Pub cheese is a soft cheese spread that is a traditional bar snack in the United States. Additional U.S. cheese spreads include benedictine, cold pack cheese and cup cheese.

Pasteurized process cheese spread
Pasteurized process cheese spread is a pasteurized processed cheese product prepared using one or more cheeses, additional ingredients and sometimes food additives such as emulsifiers (e.g. potassium phosphate and tartrate) and food stabilizers to limit product separation (e.g. carrageenan and xanthan gum). Cream, milkfat, sweeteners, water, salt, various seasonings and artificial color are sometimes used as ingredients. In the United States, the amount of cheese products used in pasteurized process cheese spread must be at least 51 percent, must contain at least 20 percent milkfat, and the moisture content must be between 44 percent to 60 percent, not exceeding 60 percent. Pasteurized process cheese spread is prepared by heating the ingredients and then pouring the mixture into various molds and containers to cool and become solid. After cooling occurs, the product is then packaged.

Gallery

See also

 Cream cheese
 List of cheese dishes
 List of spreads
 Neufchâtel cheese
 Velveeta – a brand name processed cheese product

References

Spreads (food)
Processed cheese
Cheese dishes